Aayudham Seivom is a 2008 Indian Tamil-language action film written and directed by Udhayan and produced by Pyramid Saimira. The film stars Sundar C and Anjali, while Vivek, Manivannan, Napoleon, and Vijayakumar play supporting roles. The music was composed by Srikanth Deva with cinematography by K. S. Selvaraj and editing by. Mu. Kasi Vishwanathan. The film released on 27 June 2008.

Veteran actor Vijayan was supposed to play in this movie, but died.

Plot
Saidai Sathya (Sundar C) is a mechanic who has little respect for the law. He parks his car in the middle of the road and creates trouble for other vehicles. A traffic policeman named Kandasamy (Vivek) ignores that violation because he is a close friend of Sathya. A social activist and lawyer, Udhayamoorthy (Vijayakumar), drags both of them to court for obstructing traffic and causing a nuisance. The court finds them guilty, but instead of sentencing them, the court sends them to the Madurai Gandhi Museum for help, where they meet a college student named Meenakshi (Anjali).

After Sathya is discharged, he starts a job as a henchman. VBR (Manivannan), a villainous former minister, sends Sathya to steal a confidential file containing vital evidence on the death of collector Leelavathi (Sukanya) at Udayamoorthy's place. While Sathya is stealing the file, Udayamoorthy dies by being pierced by a steel rod. While dying, Udayamoorthy blesses Sathya by saying "Vazhga Valamudan" (Long Live). These last words haunt Sathya, and filled with remorse, he vows to carry on Udayamoorthy's good work. Sathya gathers evidence to expose VBR, whom he discovers is Leelavathi's murderer. VBR's goons burn the documents to destroy the evidence. Sathya continues with his task of exposing VBR and adopts Gandhian principles of nonviolence and peace (satyagraha).

Ezhumalai (Napoleon), an Assistant Commissioner of Police, vows to avenge the death of his brother Udhayamoorthy. He thinks that Sathya killed him, although he later finds out that he did not. Sathya sits near the Gandhi statue and follows his examples of nonviolence, confident that VBR will be arrested. As he is sitting, many civilians and police order him to leave, though he does not budge. They later follow suit and sit in front of the statue. At one point, however, Sathya gets shot. Meanwhile, many protesters start to rebel against VBR. After being beat up by protesters and almost left for dead, VBR surrenders himself to the police. The film ends with Sathya surviving his shot and getting the justice.

Cast

 Sundar C as Saidai Sathya
 Anjali as Meenakshi
 Vivek as Kandasamy
 Manivannan as VBR
 Napoleon as ACP Ezhumalai
 Vijayakumar as Udhayamoorthy
 Nassar as Museum Head
 Sukanya as Leelavathi IAS
 G. M. Kumar as Annaachi
 Shanmugarajan as VBR's accomplice
 Cell Murugan as Arumugam
 Ponnambalam as Rowdy
 G. Gnanasambandam as Judge
 Crane Manohar as Museum Worker
 Chaams as Ramasamy
 Nellai Siva
 Balu Anand as Police Constable
 Muthukaalai as Passerby in Madurai
 Bava Lakshmanan as VBR's PA
 Vichu Vishwanath as A rowdy in Madurai
 Malavika as herself (cameo appearance)
 Vindhya as a dancer in Nene Pettaikku song
 Vela Ramamoorthy as Inspector (uncredited)

Soundtrack

Soundtrack was composed by Srikanth Deva and lyrics written by Pa. Vijay, Snehan and Udhayan.

Critical reception
Behindwoods wrote "Although Aayudham Seivom only has the ingredients of a commercial potboiler – fights, an item number, a little more than below-average script, and a comedy track – what makes it stand a little apart is the basic idea of its plot." Sify wrote "Like all Sundar C films, this one is also strictly aimed at the B & C audiences. It could have been far better if Udhayan had tried to explore the unknown instead of going through the same beaten track".

References

Cultural depictions of Mahatma Gandhi
Films shot in Madurai
2008 films
2000s Tamil-language films
Films scored by Srikanth Deva